Anne Semamba Makinda (born 26 July 1949) is a Tanzanian politician and the first female Speaker of the National Assembly of Tanzania, in office from 2010 to 2015. She was the last Chairman and the first President of UNICEF at the international level from 1993 to 1994.

Early life and education
Her father was a regional commissioner who served under the Nyerere administration. She was educated at Uwemba Primary School in Njombe, Masasi Girls' Secondary School in Mtwara and Kilakala Girls' High School in Morogoro.

She then pursued an accountancy course at the Institute of Development and Management (present day Mzumbe University) graduating with an advanced diploma.

Political career
She was nominated to the parliament in 1975.

References

1949 births
Living people
Chama Cha Mapinduzi MPs
Tanzanian MPs 1995–2000
Tanzanian MPs 2000–2005
Tanzanian MPs 2005–2010
Tanzanian MPs 2010–2015
Tanzanian Roman Catholics
Speakers of the National Assembly (Tanzania)
Mzumbe University alumni
21st-century Tanzanian women politicians
20th-century Tanzanian women politicians
Women legislative speakers
Tanzanian officials of the United Nations
Chairmen and Presidents of UNICEF